The 2012 Trophée des Champions was the 17th edition of the French super cup. The match was contested by Montpellier, the 2011–12 Ligue 1 champions and Lyon, the winners of the 2011–12 edition of the Coupe de France. The match was played at Red Bull Arena in Harrison, New Jersey. This was the fourth consecutive time the competition had taken place on international soil. The defending champions were Marseille who defeated Lille in the 2011 edition, which was played in Morocco.

Lyon captured its eighth Trophée des Champions and its first since 2007 after defeating Montpellier 4–2 on penalties. The match ended 2–2 in regular time with John Utaka and Emanuel Herrera scoring goals for Montpellier and Bafétimbi Gomis and Jimmy Briand converting for Lyon.

Match

Details

See also 
 2011–12 Ligue 1
 2011–12 Coupe de France

References

External links 
 Official site 

Trophee des champions
2012
Olympique Lyonnais matches
Montpellier HSC matches
International club association football competitions hosted by the United States
Sports in Hudson County, New Jersey
Soccer in New Jersey
July 2012 sports events in the United States
2012 in sports in New Jersey
Association football penalty shoot-outs